The Council House of Villarrobledo (Spanish: Casa consistorial de Villarrobledo) is a council house located in Villarrobledo, Spain. It was declared Bien de Interés Cultural in 1991.

References 

Bien de Interés Cultural landmarks in the Province of Albacete
City and town halls in Spain
Villarrobledo